"Silent Night" is a popular Christmas carol, composed in 1818 by Franz Xaver Gruber to lyrics by Joseph Mohr in the small town of Oberndorf bei Salzburg, Austria. It was declared an intangible cultural heritage by UNESCO in 2011. The song was first recorded in 1905 and has remained a popular success, appearing in films and multiple successful recordings, as well as being quoted in other musical compositions.

History
"" was first performed on Christmas Eve 1818 at St Nicholas parish church in Oberndorf, a village in the Austrian Empire on the Salzach river in present-day Austria. A young Catholic priest, Father Joseph Mohr, had come to Oberndorf the year before. In the aftermath of the Napoleonic Wars, he had written the poem "" in 1816 at Mariapfarr, the hometown of his father in the Salzburg Lungau region, where Joseph had worked as an assistant priest.

On Christmas Eve 1818, Mohr brought the words to Gruber and asked him to compose a melody and guitar accompaniment for that night's mass, after river flooding had possibly damaged the church organ. The church was eventually destroyed by repeated flooding and replaced with the Silent-Night-Chapel. It is unknown what inspired Mohr to write the lyrics, or what prompted him to create a new carol.

According to Gruber, Karl Mauracher, an organ builder who serviced the instrument at the Oberndorf church, was enamoured of the song, and took the composition home with him to the Zillertal. From there, two travelling families of folk singers, the Strassers and the Rainers, included the tune in their shows. The Rainers were already singing it around Christmas 1819, and they once performed it for an audience that included Franz I of Austria and Alexander I of Russia, as well as making the first performance of the song in the U.S., in New York City in 1839. By the 1840s the song was well known in Lower Saxony and was reported to be a favourite of Frederick William IV of Prussia. During this period, the melody changed slightly to become the version that is commonly played today.

Over the years, because the original manuscript had been lost, Mohr's name was forgotten and although Gruber was known to be the composer, many people assumed the melody was composed by a famous composer, and it was variously attributed to Haydn, Mozart, or Beethoven. It states that Mohr wrote the words in 1816 when he was assigned to a pilgrim church in Mariapfarr, Austria, and shows that the music was composed by Gruber in 1818. This is the earliest manuscript that exists and the only one in Mohr's handwriting.

Original melody

The contemporary version, as in the choral example below, is:

Translations
In 1859, the Episcopal priest John Freeman Young, then serving at Trinity Church, New York City, wrote and published the English translation that is most frequently sung today, translated from three of Mohr's original six verses. The version of the melody that is generally used today is a slow, meditative lullaby or pastorale, differing slightly (particularly in the final strain) from Gruber's original, which was a "moderato" tune in  time and siciliana rhythm. Today, the lyrics and melody are in the public domain, although newer translations usually are not. 

In 1998 the Silent Night Museum in Salzburg commissioned a new English translation by Bettina Klein of Mohr's German lyrics. Whenever possible, (and mostly), Klein leaves the Young translation unchanged, but occasionally Klein (and Mohr) varies markedly. For example, Nur das traute hochheilige Paar, Holder Knabe im lockigen Haar is translated by Young: "Round yon Virgin mother and child, Holy infant so tender and mild" whereas Klein rewords it: "Round yon godly tender pair, Holy infant with curly hair", a translation closer to the original.

The carol has been translated into about 140 languages.

Lyrics

{|
!German lyrics
!Young's English lyrics
|-
|
|style="padding-left:2em;"|Silent night! Holy night!
All is calm, all is bright
Round yon virgin mother and child!
Holy infant, so tender and mild,
Sleep in heavenly peace!
Sleep in heavenly peace!

Silent night! Holy night!
Shepherds quake at the sight!
Glories stream from heaven afar,
Heavenly hosts sing Alleluia!
Christ the Saviour is born!
Christ the Saviour is born!

Silent night! Holy night!
Son of God, love's pure light
Radiant beams from thy holy face
With the dawn of redeeming grace,
Jesus, Lord, at thy birth!
Jesus, Lord, at thy birth!
|}

Musical settings

Max Reger quotes the tune in the Christmas section of his organ pieces Sieben Stücke, Op. 145.

Alfred Schnittke composed an arrangement of "Stille Nacht" for violin and piano in 1978, as a holiday greeting for violinist Gidon Kremer. Due to its dissonant and nightmarish character, the miniature caused a scandal in Austria.

In film
Several theatrical and television films depict how the song was ostensibly written. Most of them report the organ breaking down at the church in Oberndorf, which appeared in a fictional story published in the U.S. in the 1930s.

 The Legend of Silent Night (1968) TV film directed by Daniel Mann
 Silent Night, Holy Night (1976) animated short film by Hanna-Barbera.
 Silent Mouse (1988) television special directed and produced by Robin Crichton and narrated by Lynn Redgrave.
 Buster & Chauncey's Silent Night (1998) direct-to-video animated featurette
 Silent Night (2012) directed by Christian Vuissa
 The First Silent Night (2014), documentary narrated by Simon Callow
Stille Nacht – ein Lied für die Welt (2018), music documentary created and directed by Hannes M. Schalle, narrated by Peter Simonischek. An English version, Silent Night – A Song for the World (2020), narrated by Hugh Bonneville, was released two years later.

On record charts
Several recordings of "Silent Night" have reached the record charts in various countries. These include:
1969–1979: Percy Sledge  on the Dutch Charts
1975–1976: The Cats  on the Dutch Charts
1991–1992: Sinéad O'Connor  on the Dutch Charts
2008: Glasvegas  on the Swedish Charts
2009: Mariah Carey  on the U.S. Billboard Digital Song Sales Chart
2013–2014: Elvis Presley  on the French Charts
2013–2014: Nat King Cole  on the French Charts
2017: The Temptations  on the Sweden Heatseeker (Sverigetopplistan) charts

See also
 List of Christmas carols

References

External links

 
 "Song of peace – 'Silent Night' as a message of peace"
 Translation of all six verses of the German original
 Free arrangements for piano and voice from Cantorion.org
 Silent Night Chapel, origin of song
 

1818 songs
19th-century hymns in German
Austrian songs
German-language Christmas carols
Intangible Cultural Heritage of Humanity
Songs about Jesus
Volkslied